Bhanudas Ramchandra Kavade (6 December 1923 – 2006) was an Indian politician. He was elected to the Lok Sabha, the lower house of the Parliament of India as a member of the Indian National Congress. Kavade died in 2006.

References

External links
Official biographical sketch in Parliament of India website

1923 births
2006 deaths
India MPs 1967–1970
India MPs 1971–1977
Lok Sabha members from Maharashtra